The Second Woidke cabinet was the state government of Brandenburg between 2014 and 2019, sworn in on 5 November 2014 after Dietmar Woidke was elected as Minister-President of Brandenburg by the members of the Landtag of Brandenburg. It was the 8th Cabinet of Brandenburg.

It was formed after the 2014 Brandenburg state election by the Social Democratic Party (SPD) and The Left. Excluding the Minister-President, the cabinet comprised nine ministers. Six were members of the SPD and three were members of The Left.

The second Woidke cabinet was succeeded by the third Woidke cabinet on 20 November 2019.

Formation 

The previous cabinet was a coalition government of the SPD and The Left led by Minister-President Dietmar Woidke of the SPD, who took office in August 2013.

The election took place on 14 September 2014, and resulted in a slight decline for the SPD significant losses for The Left. The opposition CDU rose from third to second place on a modest swing, while the AfD debuted at 12%. The Greens remained steady on 6%, and the FDP fell to 1.5%, losing all their seats. The BVB/FW won a direct constituency in Teltow-Fläming, which enabled them to bypass the 5% electoral threshold and win three seats with 2.7% of votes.

Overall, the incumbent coalition retained a significantly reduced majority of 47 seats out of 88, a margin of three seats. The SPD held exploratory talks with both the CDU and The Left before beginning negotiations to renew their coalition with the latter. The two parties presented their 70-page coalition agreement on 10 October. Compared to the previous cabinet, the SPD gained an additional cabinet position for a total of seven (including the Minister-President), while The Left lost one for a total of three.

Woidke was elected as Minister-President by the Landtag on 5 November, winning 47 votes out of 88 cast.

Composition 
The composition of the cabinet at the time of its dissolution was as follows:

External links

References 

Politics of Brandenburg
German state cabinets
Cabinets established in 2014
2014 establishments in Germany
2019 disestablishments in Germany